Scholarshome is an English version school and college with six campuses located in and around the city of Sylhet, Bangladesh.

Campus
Scholarshome currently has 6 campuses. 
Shahi Eidgah which is considered the main campus of Scholarshome serves students from class 6 to class 12. Pathantula and Majortila are the only campuses inclusive to students from Play to college(Majortila only has Bangla version college). Whereas Shibgonj and Madanibagh(Previously known as Electric Supply campus) serve students from Play to Primary. South Surma campus is available from Play to Class 8.

References

Schools in Sylhet District
2002 establishments in Bangladesh
Educational institutions established in 2002
Dakshin Surma Upazila